The 1958 Melbourne Carnival was the 14th edition of the Australian National Football Carnival, an Australian football interstate competition. It was the last carnival to be hosted by the state of Victoria and was also known as the Centenary Carnival as it celebrated 100 years since the creation of the sport.

For the first time since the 1950 Brisbane Carnival, all nine eligible teams in both Section 1 and Section 2 competed at the carnival. Section 1 consisted of two Victorian teams from the (VFL and VFA), South Australia, Western Australia and Tasmania; Section 2 consisted of New South Wales, Canberra, Queensland and the Australian Amateurs. In 1953 and 1956, only the Section 1 teams had travelled for the carnival, but the ANFC decided to bring all nine teams to mark the centenary celebration.

Prior to the carnival, the ANFC announced that Section 1 was to be reduced from five teams to four teams for the following carnival (held Brisbane in 1961); the team which finished last in Section 1 was to be relegated to Section 2 for 1961.

The Carnival was held between 2 July and 12 July. Day matches were held at the Melbourne Cricket Ground, and night matches were held at the South Melbourne Cricket Ground. Overall, the ANFC made a loss of more than £11,000 on the carnival, similar in magnitude to the loss made on the previous nine-team carnival in 1950.

Results
In Section 1, the Victoria (VFL) was the only undefeated team; forward John Dugdale was the carnival's leading goalkicker with 18. Western Australia and Tasmania each finished with records of 2–2; it was the most successful carnival result in Tasmania's history, with wins against both South Australia and Western Australia. Last place was decided in the match on 11 July, when South Australia's large win over the VFA saw the clubs equal on 1–3, and saw South Australia overtake the VFA on percentage.

In Section 2, the Australian Amateurs were undefeated. Canberra, which had contested the carnivals since 1933, recorded its first and second carnival wins of all-time. New South Wales was the only winless team for the carnival.

CR: indicates that this match was a curtain-raiser; the crowd figure given is for the main match.

Squads

Section 1

Section 2

All-Australian team

In 1958 the All-Australian team was picked based on the Melbourne Carnival.

Tassie Medal
Both Allen Aylett and Ted Whitten polled seven votes but Aylett was awarded the medal after a countback. Whitten was declared joint winner retrospectively in 1995.

References

 
 
 
 
 
 
 

Australian rules interstate football
Melbourne Carnival, 1958